John Dewar, 2nd Baron Forteviot   (1885–1947) was a Scottish businessman and soldier, notable as being head of the whisky giant Dewar's and of the Distillers Company and a director of the Bank of Scotland.

Life
He was born on 17 March 1885 the eldest child and only son of Sir John Dewar, 1st Baron Forteviot and his wife Johann (Joan) Tod. His uncle (his father's brother) was Thomas Dewar, 1st Baron Dewar.  He was sent to Rugby School in England as a boarder, followed by New College at Oxford University (but did not graduate).

In the First World War he served as a colonel in the Scottish Horse Regiment, serving in the Balkans, Gallipoli and Egypt. He won the Military Cross for bravery.

From 1922 to 1924 he served as Lord Provost of Perth and was also Deputy Lieutenant of Perthshire. On the death of his father in 1929 he succeeded to the title of Baron Forteviot. He also held the title of brigadier in the Royal Company of Archers, the monarch's official bodyguard in Scotland.
In 1943, he was elected a Fellow of the Royal Society of Edinburgh. His proposers were James Watt, Sidney Lord Elphinstone, James Pickering Kendall, and John Edwin MacKenzie.

He died at his country estate of Dupplin on 24 October 1947. He is buried at Aberdalgie slightly south-west of Perth. The grave lies attached to the church within the family enclosure to the rear of the church.

Family
He married twice, firstly in 1919 to Marjory Winton Isobel Heaton-Ellis (d.1945), secondly in 1946 to Marjory's sister, Mrs Muriel Cecil Harriette Cavendish (then a widow).
They had no children, however John, during his marriage to Marjory had an illegitimate daughter in 1924. When John died the baronetcy passed to his younger half brother Henry Dewar.

References

1885 births
1947 deaths
Fellows of the Royal Society of Edinburgh
Barons in the Peerage of the United Kingdom
Deputy Lieutenants of Perthshire
Officers of the Order of the British Empire
John
Recipients of the Military Cross